Pailovo is a rural locality (a village) in Mayskoye Rural Settlement, Vologodsky District, Vologda Oblast, Russia. The population was 1 as of 2002.

Geography 
Pailovo is located 25 km northwest of Vologda (the district's administrative centre) by road. Kovylevo is the nearest  locality.
mesha creek

References 

Rural localities in Vologodsky District

 the road to Semionkovo was made  with the money of the residents of Kovylevo, Pailovo, Semionkovo ,initiator Andrey Kochurov